Nappers Halt railway station is situated on the South Devon Railway, a heritage railway in Devon, England. It serves the Sea Trout Inn, near Staverton.

The station was opened by the South Devon Railway Trust. Trains only stop on special event days.

References

Heritage railway stations in Devon
Railway stations in Great Britain opened in 1999
Railway stations built for UK heritage railways